Two Hummock Island is an ice-covered island,  long in a north-south direction, conspicuous for its two rocky summits Buache Peak and Modev Peak  high, lying  southeast of Liège Island and  east of Brabant Island in the Palmer Archipelago. This name has appeared on maps for over 100 years and its usage has become established internationally.

See also 
 Composite Antarctic Gazetteer
 List of Antarctic and sub-Antarctic islands
 List of Antarctic islands south of 60° S
 SCAR
 Territorial claims in Antarctica

Maps
 British Antarctic Territory.  Scale 1:200000 topographic map.  DOS 610 Series, Sheet W 64 60.  Directorate of Overseas Surveys, UK, 1978.
Antarctic Digital Database (ADD). Scale 1:250000 topographic map of Antarctica. Scientific Committee on Antarctic Research (SCAR). Since 1993, regularly upgraded and updated.

References

External links 

 
Islands of the Palmer Archipelago